The Department of Law, University of Calcutta, Kolkata, West Bengal, formerly University College of Law, is a faculty in the University of Calcutta, founded in 1909, colloquially referred to as Hazra Law College, which offers undergraduate, postgraduate, doctorate and post doctorate courses. The Faculty oversees fifteen affiliated Law schools of the University.

History 
The college was established by the then Vice Chancellor of University of Calcutta Ashutosh Mukherjee in 1909. Prior to 1983, the Department of Law was known as the University College of Law. Sir Asutosh wanted it to be a model center of legal education. In a meeting held on 4 July 1908, the Senate recommended the proposal to establish University Law College in Kolkata. Sir Surendranath Banerjee was also present at the meeting, which was presided by Andrew Henderson Leith Fraser, the Rector of the University. The resolution was passed that a college is to be established for the promotion of legal education of the students of Bengal for degrees in law and to serve as a model college. Finally the University Law College, started functioning under the management of a government body consisting of 16 members with the Vice-Chancellor as President from July, 1909. Eminent scholar and jurist Dr. S.C. Bagchi, LL.D became the first principal and Birajmohan Majumdar was appointed the first vice-principal of this College. The Faculty has been in its current state since 1983.

Courses 
The Department offers a five-year integrated B.A LL.B.(Hons.) program. Admission to the Department's undergraduate program as well as its affiliated colleges is done on the basis of a Common Admission Test which is taken by upwards of 5,000 students every year. The Department also offers a two year Master of law (LL.M), a PhD Programme and also provides Post-Doctoral research (LL.D).

Notable alumni 

The services of the Department to the University and the country are not always realized. The Department of Law has been, during the course of its existence for over a century, a nursery of leaders of the State, Bar and the Judiciary.

Presidents
 Rajendra Prasad - First President of India
 Pranab Mukherjee - 13th President of India
 Abdus Sattar - President of Bangladesh and Interior Minister of Pakistan
 Abu Sadat Mohammad Sayem - First Chief Justice of Bangladesh and President of Bangladesh
 Fazlul Qadir Chaudhry - Acting President of Pakistan and Federal Minister

Prime Ministers
 A. K. Fazlul Huq - 1st Prime Minister of Bengal and Interior Minister of Pakistan
 B. P. Koirala - First democratically elected prime minister of Nepal
 Nurul Amin - 8th prime minister of Pakistan and 1st Vice President

Chief Justices
 Bijan Kumar Mukherjea - 4th Chief Justice of India
 Sudhi Ranjan Das - 5th Chief Justice of India
 Amal Kumar Sarkar - 8th Chief Justice of India
 Altamas Kabir - 39th Chief Justice of India
 Fazal Akbar - 6th Chief Justice of Pakistan
 Kemaluddin Hossain - 3rd Chief Justice of Bangladesh

Supreme Court Judges and other luminaries
 Pinaki Chandra Ghose - First Lokpal and Judge of the Supreme Court of India.
 Indira Banerjee - Sitting Judge in the Supreme Court of India
 Radhabinod Pal - International Jurist
 Asok Kumar Ganguly - Former Judge in the Supreme Court of India
 G.N. Ray - Former Judge in the Supreme Court of India
 Bankim Chandra Ray - Former Judge in the Supreme Court of India
 Ganendra Narayan Ray - Former Judge in the Supreme Court of India and chief justice of the Gujarat High Court
 Alak Chandra Gupta - Former Judge in the Supreme Court of India
 M. K. Mukherjee - Former Judge in the Supreme Court of India
 S.C. Sen - Former Judge in the Supreme Court of India
 Tarun Chatterjee - Former Judge in the Supreme Court of India
 N. L. Untwalia - Former Judge in the Supreme Court of India
 Amarendra Nath Sen - Judge in the Supreme Court of India and Chief Justice of the Calcutta High Court
 Ganendra Narayan Ray - Judge in the Supreme Court of India and Chief Justice of the Gujarat High Court

Chief Justices of High Courts
 Shyamal Kumar Sen - Chief Justice of Allahabad High Court and Governor of West Bengal
 Anandamoy Bhattacharjee -  Chief Justice of the Calcutta High Court, (Acting) Sikkim High Court and the Bombay High Court 
 Anil Kumar Sen - Chief Justice of the Calcutta High Court
 Sambhunath Banerjee - Chief Justice of the Calcutta High Court
 Dipankar Datta - Chief Justice of the Bombay High Court
 Sanjib Banerjee - Chief Justice of the Meghalaya High Court
 Biswanath Somadder - Chief Justice of Sikkim High Court
 Mukul Gopal Mukherjee - Chief Justice of the Rajasthan High Court.
 Samarendra Chandra Deb - Chief Justice of the Calcutta High Court
 Subhasis Talapatra - former acting Chief Justice of Tripura High Court
 Debasish Kar Gupta - Chief Justice of the Calcutta High Court

Attorney Generals
 Rafique Ul Huq - Attorney General of Bangladesh
 Niren De - Attorney General of India

Politicians
 Siddhartha Shankar Ray -  Lawyer, diplomat and Indian National Congress politician from West Bengal
 Biman Banerjee -  Speaker of the West Bengal Legislative Assembly since 2011
 Syama Prasad Mookerjee - Founder of the Bhartiya Jana Sangh
 Jogendra Nath Mandal - 1st Minister for Law and Justice (Pakistan)
 Azizul Haque - Viceroy's Executive Council member and Bengali Politician
Nirmal Chandra Chatterjee - Indian jurist and Parliamentarian
 Amar Singh - Politician
 Asutosh Law - Lawyer and Politician
 Tathagata Roy - Politician
 B. N. Banerjee - Parliamentarian
 Bhaskar Choudhury -  Indian politician from Meghalaya
 Syed Abul Mansur Habibullah - Politician
 Durga Charan Banerjee - Indian jurist and a member of parliament
 Gopinath Bordoloi - first Chief Minister of Assam
 Pratap Chandra Chunder - Former Minister of education and social welfare portfolio
 Azizul Haque - Bengali lawyer, writer, Politician and public servant
 Snehansu Kanta Acharya - Lawyer and Politician
 Kamal Basu - Politician

Others
 Protik Prakash Banerjee - Former Calcutta High Court Judge
 Haridas Bhattacharya -  Bengali Indian philosopher, author and educationist
 Soumitra Sen -  former judge of the Calcutta High Court. 
 Birinchi Kumar Barua - folklorist, scholar, novelist, playwright, historian, linguist, educationist, administrator
 Nares Chandra Sen-Gupta - Legal scholar and  Bengali novelist

References 

University of Calcutta affiliates
Educational institutions established in 1909
Law schools in West Bengal
1909 establishments in British India